Torino Porta Susa  is a railway station in Turin, northern Italy; it is the second busiest mainline station in the city, after Torino Porta Nuova. It is located in Corso Inghilterra.

History
The station was built in 1868 during the expansion of the city towards the west. Trains between Torino Porta Nuova and Milan stop at the station, including TGV services between Paris and Milan and other services using the Turin–Milan high-speed line.

Reconstruction
In April 2006, reconstruction of the station began in conjunction with the Turin Passante regional railway. This involved quadrupling of the number of tracks that run through central Turin. At Porta Susa station, the line was widened to six tracks with new platforms being built beneath the thoroughfare Corso Inghilterra. A 300-metre long, 19-metre high glass and steel structure has been built above the tracks to create a new station, which is intended to become Turin's main hub of urban, regional and international rail traffic.

The project was developed by the Paris-based studio, Silvio d'Ascia Architecture, in collaboration with AREP and Agostino Magnaghi, after the team had won an international competition. The station was inaugurated on 14 January 2013 by Prime Minister Mario Monti. The total cost – estimated at €65 million – was borne entirely by the rail network operator, Rete Ferroviaria Italiana (RFI). Plans for the reconstruction project also included a 100-metre high office tower for the Italian State Railways, Ferrovie dello Stato.

The Turin Metro opened a metro station at Porta Susa, which provides additional connections with Porta Nuova and Lingotto.

Train services
The station is served by the following services:

High speed services (TGV) Paris - Lyon - Chambéry - Turin - Milan
High speed services (Frecciarossa) Paris - Lyon - Chambéry - Turin - Milan
High speed services (Frecciarossa) Turin – Milan – Bologna – Florence – Rome
High speed services (Frecciarossa) Turin – Milan – Bologna – Reggio Emilia – Florence – Rome – Naples – Salerno
High speed services (Italo) Turin - Milan - Bologna - Reggio Emilia - Florence - Rome - Naples - Salerno
High speed services (Frecciabianca) Turin - Milan - Brescia - Verona - Vicenza - Padua - Venice - Trieste
Night train (Intercity Notte) Turin - Milan - Parma - Rome - Naples - Salerno
Night train (Intercity Notte) Turin - Milan - Parma - Reggio Emilia - Florence - Rome - Salerno - Lamezia Terme - Reggio di Calabria
Express services (Regionale Veloce) Turin - Chivasso – Santhià – Vercelli – Novara – Milan
Express services (Regionale Veloce) Turin - Chivasso – Ivrea – Aosta
Regional services (Treno regionale) Turin - Chivasso - Santhià - Biella
Regional services (Treno regionale) Turin – Asti – Alessandria – Ronco – Genoa
Turin Metropolitan services (SFM1) Rivarolo - Turin - Chieri
Turin Metropolitan services (SFM2) Pinerolo - Turin - Chivasso
Turin Metropolitan services (SFM4) Turin - Alba
Turin Metropolitan services (SFM6) Turin - Asti
Turin Metropolitan services (SFM7) Fossano - Turin

Metro services
Turin Metro service M1 serves the station.

M1: Fermi - Porta Susa - Porta Nuovo - Lingotto

See also
Turin Metro
Turin metropolitan railway service
Torino Porta Nuova railway station

References

External links

Porta Susa
Railway stations located underground in Italy
Railway stations opened in 1868
1868 establishments in Italy
Railway stations in Italy opened in the 19th century